Secret Story 6 is the sixth season of Secret Story. The show started on May 25, 2012 and concluded on September 7, 2012. The winner is Nadège Lacroix.

Housemates

Alexandre 
He is 20 years old, and is from Lyon, France. He entered the House on Day 1. His secret is "My ex and her other ex is in the house" (with Capucine and Yoann). He was evicted on Day 22.

Audrey Mazens (Sanchez) 
She is 28 years old, originally from Lyon, France, currently living in Miami, United States. She entered the Secret Box on Day 1 and her secret is "I am a housemate of the Secret Box". She shares this secret with Emilie and Midou. She entered in the House on Day 8.

Capucine 
She is 21 years old, and is from Lyon, France. She entered the House on Day 1. Her secret is "Both of my exes are in the House". She shares this secret with Alexandre and Yoann. She was evicted on Day 71.

In 2019 she completed the second season of Je suis une célébrité, sortez-moi de là !.

Caroline 
She's from Longeville-les-Metz in France. Her secret is "I live with my ex-boyfriend and his wife" (with Kévin and Virginie). She entered the House on Day 1 and was evicted on Day 29.

David 
He is 20 years old, and is from Paris, France. He entered the House on Day 1 and was ejected by la Voix on Day 19 for threatening behavior towards Audrey, Caroline, Fanny, and Kévin.

Émilie 
She is 26 years old, and is from Seraing in Belgium. She is a singer and especially a musician. She entered the Secret Box on Day 1 and her secret is "I am a housemate of the Secret Box". She shares this secret with Audrey and Midou. She entered the House on Day 6. She left on Day 57.

Fanny
She is 28 years old, and is from Paris (Maisons-Alfort) in France. She entered the House on Day 1. Her secret is "I have +100 tattoos on my body". She was evicted on Day 85.

Ginie 
She is 20 years old, and is from Brussels, municipality of Kortenberg in Belgium. She was evicted on Day 43.

Isabella 
She is 18 years old, and is from Paris, France. She entered the House on Day 1. She was evicted on Day 8.

Julien 
He is 21 years old, and is from Paris (Combs-la-Ville) in France. He entered the House on Day 1.

Kévin 
He is 33 years old, and comes from Longeville-les-Metz in France. He entered the House on Day 1. His secret is "I live with my wife and my ex-girlfriend" (with Virginie and Caroline). He was evicted on Day 65.

Marie 
She is 25 years old and is from Paris, France. She entered the House on Day 1. Her secret is "I am a chess grandmaster". She left the House on Day 4.

Matthieu 
He is 27 years old and is from Châteauguay in Canada, a suburb of Montreal, in southwestern Quebec. He entered the House on Day 1. Matthieu revealed to the viewers and to the host his secret in the Diary Room on Day 1. His secret is "I survived a plane crash". He left the House on Day 14.

Midou 
He is 26 years old and is from Paris (Champs-sur-Marne) in France. He entered the Secret Box on Day 1. His secret is "I am a housemate of the Secret Box". He shares this secret with Audrey and Emilie. He entered the House on Day 8 and was eliminated on Day 36.

Nadège 
She is 25 years old and is from Thônex in Switzerland, a municipality of Genève. She entered the House on Day 8. Her secret is "We are not really siblings" (with Thomas). She is the winner of Secret Story 6.

Sacha 
He is 18 years old and is from Beaucouze in France. He entered the House on Day 1. His secret is "I received my bac at age 14". He was evicted on Day 99.

Sergueï 
He is 25 years old, and is from Nice, France. His secret is "I was switched at birth". He was evicted on Day 15.

Thomas 
He is 24 years old and is from Aix en Provence in France. He entered the House on Day 8. His secret is "We are not really siblings" (with Nadège). He was ejected on Day 93 for physical violence against Nadège.

Virginie 
She is 27 years old and is from Longeville-les-Metz in France. She entered the house on Day 1. Her secret is "I live with my husband and his ex-girlfriend" (with Caroline and Kévin). She was evicted on Day 92.

Yoann 
He is 21 years old, and is from Lyon, France. He entered the House on Day 1 and his secret is "My ex and her other ex is in the house" (with Alexandre and Capucine).

Secrets

Nominations Table

Nominations: Results

Live Show Ratings
The launch is @ 8.50p.m., the Live Shows are @ 10.30/10.50p.m. to 00.15a.m.

The After Secret Ratings

Night Live Feed

References

External links
  Official website for Secret Story
 Big brother news site

2012 French television seasons
06